G-Sale is a 2003 mockumentary film about garage sales and the people who are obsessed by them. The film is reminiscent of the movies of Christopher Guest and won several film festival awards.

Plot
Bogwood, Washington is a pleasant suburban community with a special distinction—it has more garages per capita than any other town in America. Not surprisingly, Bogwood is also the "Garage Sale Capital of the U.S.A."

When retirees Doris & Clayton Fenwick decide to empty their nest of retro-modern antiques, they set the wheels in motion for a frantically funny "g-sale" involving Bogwood's most avid garage sale junkies: Angela Cocci (an obsessive market researcher), Ed LaSalle (a beleaguered computer programmer and creator of the cult fantasy roleplaying game "Caves & Beasts"), Dick Nickerson (a retired star of the 60s sitcom "Pot o' Gold"), and BJ Harwood & Helen Ziegler (partners and owners of a trendy retro-modern antique store).

These colorful characters try to outmaneuver each other to score their ultimate garage sale treasure: an antique board game worth a fortune.

Location
Bogwood was filmed on location in Seattle, Bellevue, and Bainbridge Island, Washington.

References

External links
 
 

2003 films
American mockumentary films
American parody films
2000s parody films
2003 comedy films
2000s English-language films
2000s American films